Roy Underhill (born December 22, 1950) is an American woodworker and television show host. Born and raised in Washington, D.C., he was the first master housewright at the Colonial Williamsburg reconstruction. Since 1979, he has been the host of the PBS series The Woodwright's Shop. Along with This Old House, which debuted the same year, it is the longest running PBS "how-to" show.

Underhill was introduced to traditional woodworking by a sister who worked at the Smithsonian Institution. He attended the University of North Carolina at Chapel Hill and earned a degree in Theater. In the early 1970s, Underhill and his wife moved to Colorado to form Homestead Arts to pursue a career in acting. When that failed, the Underhills moved to a remote area of New Mexico where traditional woodworking was one of the few means of survival.

In the late 1970s, Underhill moved back to North Carolina and Duke University, pursuing a multi-disciplinary course of study including engineering, forestry, and history and was subsequently awarded a Master of Forestry in 1977. At the birth of his first daughter, he approached the UNC Center for Public Television with an idea about a traditional woodworking show. Initially rejected, the idea was finally accepted; in 1979, filming began on The Woodwright's Shop at West Point on the Eno in Durham, N.C. Around the same time, he also took the job as master housewright and later director of interpretive development at Colonial Williamsburg in Virginia.

More recently, Underhill also works as a communications consultant. He is the author of several books, including The Woodwright's Eclectic Workshop and Woodwright's Shop: A Practical Guide to Traditional Woodcraft. In 2011 he gave a presentation at TEDx Raleigh, sharing the value of ingenuity and living in the present. 

Underhill has started teaching traditional woodworking in a classroom environment he calls "The Woodwright's School". As of January 2014, his classroom is located in Pittsboro, North Carolina. 

Many hand tool aficionados hold Underhill in extremely high regard and may refer to him with the shorthand "St. Roy."

Publications

References

External links
PBS site for The Woodwright's Shop
UNC Press – The Woodwright's Shop minisite
Woodworker's Journal Article - A Quarter Century Of Subversive Woodworking 2005
Mother Earth News interview from 1985
A 1983 Mother Earth News article
Woodwright's Shop 27th Season Announcement
The Woodwright's School

1950 births
Living people
American woodworkers
Duke University alumni
University of North Carolina at Chapel Hill alumni
People from Washington, D.C.
People from Chapel Hill, North Carolina